The Wilson Avenue station is a station on the BMT Canarsie Line of the New York City Subway. Located at the intersection of Wilson Avenue and Moffat Street in Brooklyn, it is served by the L train at all times.

History

Wilson Avenue opened on July 14, 1928, as part of an extension of the Canarsie Line. This extension connected Montrose Avenue, which had opened four years earlier, to Broadway Junction, which was the western end of the already-operating elevated line to Canarsie.

On September 21, 1984, Irma Lozada, a New York City Transit Police officer, was murdered at an abandoned lot south of the station. Lozada was part of the Plain Clothes Anti-Crime (PCAC) unit when she was gunned down by Darryl Jeter, a chain snatcher that took her service gun as she attempted to arrest him for stealing a necklace from a rider. Lozada was the first policewoman to be killed in action in New York City.

A renovation, costing between three and five million dollars, added handicapped access to the ground-level Manhattan-bound platform under the Americans with Disabilities Act of 1990 (ADA) via the use of a ramp from the Wilson Avenue entrance. The elevated Canarsie-bound platform was not proposed to get ADA access since it would be much more costly to add an elevator up to the Canarsie-bound level.

Station layout

The station, which was designed by Robert Ridgway and Squire J. Vickers, has some features that are not found elsewhere in the system. It is squeezed in between the Most Holy Trinity Cemetery, to the east, and the New York Connecting Railroad (NYCR) and the Long Island Railroad (LIRR) Bay Ridge Branch, to the west. The two tracks and two side platforms are on different levels, making Wilson Avenue the only station on the Canarsie Line where this occurs. Since the platforms are on different levels, each has a different design. The outbound track sits on a low elevated structure; immediately south of the station, the outbound track passes over Central Avenue before descending into a tunnel toward Bushwick Avenue–Aberdeen Street. The inbound track is immediately below the outbound track, and this portion of the station gives the impression of being underground, but it is really at street level.

The Rockaway Parkway-bound (upper level) platform has a canopy along the entire length of the platform, supported by a beige concrete retaining wall with curved green supports extending from the wall at regular intervals. A fence runs along the track side of the southbound platform, separating the subway station from the Most Holy Trinity Cemetery, which is visible directly through the fence.  The Manhattan-bound (lower level) platform has tiling and name plaques, which is typical for a Canarsie Line underground station. A concrete wall closes off the east side of the lower level. The mosaic band is predominantly green at edges with a vivid multicolored design throughout, 28 colors in all. The trackside wall once had tiles that matched those of the platform, but these tiles were  removed sometime after 1982, and the trackside wall is currently the same plain, dark color as a typical New York City Subway tunnel wall.

Exit
There is one entrance and exit to the station, which is in a dead-end at the foot of Wilson Avenue, just east of Moffat Street. There are five steps leading up to the station entrance, as well as a wheelchair ramp. The entrance feeds directly onto the northbound platform with stairs to southbound service on the upper level.

References

Further reading

External links 

 
 Station Reporter — 
 The Subway Nut — Wilson Avenue Pictures
 Wilson Avenue entrance from Google Maps Street View
 Upper platform from Google Maps Street View (Daytime)
 Upper platform from Google Maps Street View (Evening)
 Lower platform from Google Maps Street View

BMT Canarsie Line stations
Railway and subway stations on the National Register of Historic Places in New York City
New York City Subway stations in Brooklyn
Railway stations in the United States opened in 1928
Bushwick, Brooklyn
National Register of Historic Places in Brooklyn